Geoffrey Mark Wolfson OBE (7 April 1934 – 14 November 2018), known as Mark Wolfson, was Conservative MP for Sevenoaks from 1979 until he retired in 1997.

Early life
Mark Wolfson was educated at Eton College and Pembroke College, Cambridge. He served in the Royal Navy from 1952 to 1954. After working as a teacher, he was Head of Youth Services at The Industrial Society from 1966 to 1969, leading the I'm Backing Britain campaign. He became a director of Hambros Bank in 1973.

Political career
Wolfson contested Islington North in February 1974, and then Paddington in October 1974, each time being beaten by Labour incumbents.

He was elected for the safe Conservative seat of Sevenoaks in 1979, which he held until he stood down at the 1997 general election. His successor was fellow Conservative Michael Fallon.

He subsequently became director of Brathay Trust and was appointed OBE in the 2002 New Year Honours.

References 

Times Guide to the House of Commons, Times Newspapers Limited, 1992.

External links 
 

1934 births
2018 deaths
People educated at Eton College
Conservative Party (UK) MPs for English constituencies
Officers of the Order of the British Empire
UK MPs 1983–1987
UK MPs 1979–1983
UK MPs 1987–1992
UK MPs 1992–1997
British Jews
Jewish British politicians